Carlisle Sessions Floyd (June 11, 1926September 30, 2021) was an American composer primarily known for his operas. These stage works, for which he wrote the librettos, typically engage with themes from the American South, particularly the Post-civil war South, the Great Depression and rural life. His best known opera, Susannah, is based on a story from the Biblical Apocrypha, transferred to contemporary rural Tennessee, and written for a Southern dialect. It was premiered at Florida State University in 1955, with Phyllis Curtin in the title role. When it was staged at the New York City Opera the following year, the reception was initially mixed; some considered it a masterpiece, while others degraded it as a 'folk opera'. Subsequent performances led to an increase in Susannah's reputation and the opera quickly became among the most performed of American operas.

In 1976, he became M. D. Anderson professor at the University of Houston. He co-founded the Houston Opera Studio for the training of young singers. Floyd is regarded as the "Father of American opera".

Life and career

Youth and education
Carlisle Sessions Floyd was born in Latta, South Carolina, on June 11, 1926 to Carlisle and Ida (née Fenegan) Floyd.  His father was his namesake and a Methodist minister at the local church; on both sides his family was descended from among the first European immigrants to the Carolinas. He had a sister, Ermine, along with a sizable extended family. Being raised in the Southern United States, Floyd would have been well aquatinted with typical Southern ideals of the time, such as Southern hospitality, extra caution to avoid offending others, Protestantism and a general disliking towards the Northerners. Also prominent in his Southern upbringing were revival meetings, the "bigotry" of which later influenced his work. Though the family was not familiar with contemporary classical music, Floyd's mother enjoyed music and poetry, often hosting family hymn singing events. She also gave Floyd his first piano lessons. Floyd attended North High School in North Carolina.

Though American involvement in World War II had begun in 1941, Floyd's asthma prevented his conscription. He attended Converse College of Spartanburg, South Carolina in 1944, studying piano with composer Ernst Bacon. In 1945 Bacon left Converse to become director of the music school at Syracuse University, New York, a considerably more multicultural institution. Floyd followed Bacon to Syracuse and received a Bachelor of Music in 1946. The following year, Floyd became part of the piano faculty at Florida State University in Tallahassee. He stayed there for thirty years, eventually becoming Professor of Composition. He received a master's degree at Syracuse in 1949.

Emerging composer and Susannah
While at FSU, Floyd gradually became interested in composition. His first opera was Slow Dusk to his own libretto, and was produced at Syracuse in 1949. His next opera, The Fugitives, was seen at Tallahassee in 1951 but was withdrawn.

Floyd's third opera was his greatest success: Susannah. It was premiered at Florida State at the Ruby Diamond Auditorium in February 1955, with Phyllis Curtin in the title role and Mack Harrell as the Reverend Olin Blitch. The following year, the opera was given at the New York City Opera, winning him international recognition. Erich Leinsdorf conducted, with Curtin and Norman Treigle as Blitch. The opera received the New York Music Critics' Circle Award. It was selected to be America's official operatic entry at the 1958 World's Fair in Brussels, directed by Frank Corsaro, with Curtin, Treigle and Richard Cassilly.

Further operas
In 1976, he became M. D. Anderson professor at the University of Houston. There, he co-founded the Houston Opera Studio, together with David Gockley, as an institution of the University of Houston and Houston Grand Opera, with students including Michael Ching and Craig Bohmler.

Later in 1958, Floyd's Wuthering Heights (after Emily Brontë) premiered at the Santa Fe Opera, with Curtin as the heroine. In 1960, at Syracuse, his solo cantata on biblical texts, Pilgrimage, was first heard with Treigle as soloist. The Passion of Jonathan Wade, commissioned by the Ford Foundation, was Floyd's most epic opera, set in South Carolina during the Reconstruction era. It was premiered at the New York City Opera on October 11, 1962. Theodor Uppman, Curtin, Treigle and Harry Theyard performed in a large cast, conducted by Julius Rudel and directed by Allen Fletcher. Floyd revised it in 1989 for performances at four major opera houses in the U.S., beginning at Houston Grand  Opera.

Floyd's next opera was The Sojourner and Mollie Sinclair, which was a comedy around Scottish settlers of the Carolinas.  Patricia Neway and Treigle created the title roles with Rudel conducting. The opera Markheim (after Robert Louis Stevenson) was first shown at the New Orleans Opera Association in 1966, with Treigle (to whom it was dedicated) and Audrey Schuh heading the cast. Floyd himself served as stage director.

The opera Of Mice and Men (after John Steinbeck) was commissioned by the Ford Foundation. After a long gestation period, it was premiered at the Seattle Opera in 1970, directed by Corsaro.  A monodrama on the royal subject of Eleanor of Aquitaine, Flower and Hawk, premiered in Jacksonville, Florida, with Curtin directed by Corsaro. The production was also presented at Carnegie Hall.

Bilby's Doll (after Esther Forbes) was commissioned by the Houston Grand Opera where it was premiered in 1976 with Christopher Keene conducting and David Pountney directing. Floyd composed Willie Stark (after Robert Penn Warren) also for Houston, where it was first heard in 1981 in a staging by Harold Prince. After a hiatus of almost twenty years, another Floyd opera premiered in Houston in 2000, Cold Sassy Tree (after Olive Ann Burns). Patrick Summers conducted, Bruce Beresford directed, and Patricia Racette led the cast. It was subsequently produced by several American opera houses.

Retirement and later years

After retirement from the university in Houston in 1996, Floyd lived in Tallahassee again. He had composed a Piano Sonata in the 1950s (1957, two years after Susannah) for Rudolf Firkušný, who played it at a Carnegie Hall recital, but it languished until Daniell Revenaugh recorded it in 2009 at the age of 74. Revenaugh worked with the composer in learning the piece (Floyd himself had never learned it), and their rehearsal sessions and the live recording itself were filmed for posterity. The recording was made on the Alma-Tadema Steinway that graced the White House during the presidencies of Theodore Roosevelt and Woodrow Wilson.

The Houston Grand Opera produced a new opera by Floyd on March 5, 2016, Prince of Players, a chamber opera about the 17th-century actor, Edward Kynaston, conducted by Summers. A live recording of the premiere was nominated for a Grammy Award.

Floyd died on September 30, 2021 in Tallahassee, at the age of 95. He had no children, but was survived by four nieces, the daughters of Ermine. His publisher Boosey and Hawkes, announced his death and did not relay the cause.

Music

Legacy and reputation
Floyd is primarily known for his operas, which make up the bulk of his compositional output. Like Wagner and Menotti, Floyd wrote the librettos to his operas. His best-known opera, Susannah, is regarded as his magnum opus. The National Public Radio's Tom Huizenga posits the work as suitable contender to be considered the archetypal "Great American Opera". Patricia Racette declared that "If it is not the greatest American opera, it's certainly among the great American operas". According to Opera News, Susannah is the most frequently performed American opera after Gershwin's Porgy and Bess and Menotti's Amahl and the Night Visitors. The Daily Telegraph, however, claimed it is the most "widely performed" American opera, purportedly outnumbering some works by Mozart, Verdi and Puccini. In addition to Gershwin and Menotti, Floyd stands with Adams, Barber, Bernstein, Glass and Rorem in the pantheon of preeminent 20th-century American opera composers.

Selected recordings

Discography
 Susannah (Studer, Hadley, Ramey; Nagano, 1993–94) Virgin Classics
 Susannah (Curtin, Cassilly, Treigle; Andersson, 1962) [live] VAI
 Wuthering Heights (Jarman, Mentzer, Markgraf; Mechavich, 2015) [live] Reference Recordings
 Pilgrimage: excerpts (Treigle; Torkanowsky, 1971) Orion
 The Sojourner and Mollie Sinclair (Neway, Treigle; Rudel, 1963) VAI
 Markheim (Schuh, Treigle; Andersson, 1966) [live] VAI
 Of Mice and Men (Futral, Griffey, Hawkins; Summers, 2002) [live] Albany Records
 Cold Sassy Tree (Racette; Summers, 2000) [live] Albany Records

Videography
 Susannah: Revival Scene (Treigle; Yestadt, Treigle, 1958) [live] Bel Canto Society
 Willie Stark (Jesse; J.Keene, McDonough, 2007) [live] Newport Classic
 Susannah (Spatafora, Webb, Donovan; Sforzini, Unger, 2014) [live] Naxos

List of compositions
Floyd's compositions were published by Boosey and Hawkes.

Awards and honors

 1956 Guggenheim Fellowship
 1957 Citation of Merit from the National Association of American Conductors and Composers
 1959 Ten Outstanding Young Men of the Nation Award from the U.S. Junior Chamber of Commerce
 1964 Distinguished Professor of Florida State University Award
 1983 Honorary degree from Dickinson College
 1983 National Opera Institute's Award for Service to American Opera – the highest honor the institute bestows
 1993 Brock Commission from the American Choral Directors Association.
 2001 Inducted into the American Academy of Arts and Letters
 2004 National Medal of Arts from the White House
 2005 Honorary Doctorate from Florida State University
 2008 National Endowment for the Arts Opera Honoree for lifetime work
 2010 Anton Coppola Excellence in the Arts Award from Opera Tampa
 2012 Phi Mu Alpha Sinfonia Man of Music – the highest honor for a member of the American music fraternity.

References

Notes

Citations

Sources

Further reading

External links

 
 
 Operas we would like to see again
 Interview with Carlisle Floyd, May 4, 1991.

1926 births
2021 deaths
20th-century classical composers
American male classical composers
American classical composers
American opera composers
American opera librettists
Male opera composers
21st-century classical composers
Texas classical music
Members of the American Academy of Arts and Letters
United States National Medal of Arts recipients
Florida State University faculty
University of Houston faculty
Syracuse University College of Visual and Performing Arts alumni
People from Latta, South Carolina
Classical musicians from South Carolina
21st-century American composers
20th-century American composers
20th-century American male musicians
21st-century American male musicians
Converse University alumni